The women's shot put at the 1938 European Athletics Championships was held in Vienna, at the time part of German Reich, at Praterstadion on 17 September 1938.

Medalists

Results

Final
17 September

Participation
According to an unofficial count, 12 athletes from 8 countries participated in the event.

 (1)
 (3)
 (1)
 (1)
 (1)
 (2)
 (1)
 (2)

References

Shot put
Shot put at the European Athletics Championships
Euro